The Faribault Daily News is a local newspaper in Faribault, Minnesota, area. It is published six days a week since 1948 and is a wholly owned subsidiary of Adams Publishing Group. Chad Hjellming is the Publisher and Regional General Manager of this daily. Its website has averaged over 250,000 hits per month in 2018.

History/General Information 

Aside from its daily local content, which finds its strength in general news reporting and in-depth profile features, the Faribault Daily News contains many additional local publications such as a lifestyle magazine titled "Southern Minn Girlfriends." This is a magazine which is published every other month and claims on their homepage to "connect local women in a genuine way."

Starting around 2014, the Daily News sports department endured a drastic turnover in staff due to a number of factors and cycled through roughly 10 combined editors/full-time reporters from 2014 to 2020. Due to the economic impact of the COVID-19 global pandemic, the FDN has been without a formal sports editor for more than four months as of May 17, 2020.

Former sports editor, Josh Berhow, who worked at the Daily News for three years in the mid-2010s, is currently the Senior Editor at Golf.com.

Coverage 
Faribault Daily News is owned by Adams Publishing Group, based out of Northern Minnesota.

Awards 
In 2013, the sports journalists of the Faribault Daily News won three awards in the Minnesota AP Sports Awards competition.  The award was announced on July 14, 2014.

References

External links 

 Faribault Daily News official website
 Southern Minn Girlfriends

Newspapers published in Minnesota
Publications established in 1948
Daily newspapers published in the United States